Dastgerd (also Romanized as Dastgird and Dastjerd) is a city in the Central District of Borkhar County, Isfahan Province, Iran.  At the 2006 census, its population was 15,524, in 4,028 families.

References

Populated places in Borkhar County

Cities in Isfahan Province